Kazunori Yamamoto (山本 一徳, born June 13, 1983) is a Japanese former professional baseball pitcher in Japan's Nippon Professional Baseball. He played for the Hokkaido Nippon-Ham Fighters in 2007, and from 2009 to 2010 and with the Chiba Lotte Marines in 2011.

External links

1983 births
Living people
People from Shimane Prefecture
Waseda University alumni
Japanese expatriate baseball players in the United States
Waikiki Beach Boys players
Nippon Professional Baseball pitchers
Hokkaido Nippon-Ham Fighters players
Chiba Lotte Marines players